The Women's 100 metre breaststroke competition at the 2022 World Aquatics Championships was held on 19 and 20 June 2022.

Records
Prior to the competition, the existing world and championship records were as follows.

Results

Heats
The heats were started on 19 June at 09:32.

Semifinals
The semifinals were started on 18 June at 18:29.

Final
The finals was started on 20 June at 19:48.

References

Women's 100 metre breaststroke